Willard Sheldon Reaves (born August 17, 1959) is an American-Canadian former professional gridiron football running back who played for the Winnipeg Blue Bombers in Canadian Football League, and for the Miami Dolphins and the Washington Redskins and the Green Bay Packers in the National Football League.

College career
Reaves played college football at Northern Arizona University from 1977 to 1980.  He rushed for 2,139 yards at university, the best being 1979 when he rushed for 1,084 yards and was voted First-team All Big Sky Conference First-team All American.

In 1992, Reaves was inducted into the Northern Arizona University Athletics Hall of Fame, and in 2002 he became a member of the Manitoba Sports Hall of Fame and Museum.

Professional career

Canadian Football League
Reaves played five seasons for the Blue Bombers from 1983 to 1987.  He rushed for 898 yards in his first year and was runner up for the CFL's Most Outstanding Rookie Award and an all star. In 1984, he led the league rushing for 1,733 yards on 304 carries and 18 touchdowns, all team records.  He also set a CFL record with 2,140 yards from scrimmage. He won the CFL's Most Outstanding Player Award.  He also helped his team win the 72nd Grey Cup, their first victory since 1962.

Reaves rushed for 1,000 yards two other times (1,323 in 1985 and 1,471 in 1987), he led the league in both seasons. He finished his career with 5,923 total rushing yards for the Blue Bombers.  He led the CFL in rushing 3 times in his career.  He was a three time CFL all star.

National Football League
In 1988, he got into a contract dispute with the Bombers, who wanted Reaves to take a massive paycut. He was released and tried out with the NFL (he was originally undrafted) and in 1989 he played two games with the Miami Dolphins and one game with the Washington Redskins.

Career regular season rushing statistics

Personal life
Following his retirement from the NFL, Reaves moved back to Winnipeg and became a sergeant with the Manitoba Sheriff Service. Willard's eldest son, Ryan Reaves, is a professional ice hockey right wing for the Minnesota Wild of the National Hockey League. Willard's youngest son, Jordan Reaves, is a professional football player with the Edmonton Elks of the CFL. He also has two daughters, Regina and Renee.

In October 2021, Reaves was announced as the Manitoba Liberal Party's candidate in the 2022 Fort Whyte by-election to the Legislative Assembly of Manitoba. Reaves ultimately lost to Progressive Conservative candidate and fellow former Blue Bomber, Obby Khan.

In February 2023, Willard Reaves' family history grows considering during a school black history month presentation he claims to be the great grandson of Bass Reeves , and also the 2nd cousin of Kobe Bryant .

References

External links
Willard Reaves’s biography at Manitoba Sports Hall of Fame and Museum

1959 births
Living people
American football running backs
American emigrants to Canada
American players of Canadian football
Black Canadian players of Canadian football
Canadian Football League Most Outstanding Player Award winners
Canadian Football League Rookie of the Year Award winners
Canadian football running backs
Edmonton Elks players
Miami Dolphins players
Northern Arizona Lumberjacks football players
People from Flagstaff, Arizona
Players of American football from Arizona
Washington Redskins players
Winnipeg Blue Bombers players
African-American players of American football
African-American players of Canadian football
21st-century African-American people
20th-century African-American sportspeople
Canadian sportsperson-politicians
Manitoba Liberal Party candidates in Manitoba provincial elections